The white-tipped tufted-tailed rat (Eliurus penicillatus) is a rodent endemic to Madagascar. It is known from only two specimens, one collected from  Ampitambe forest in 1895 or 1896 and the second in 2000. It is listed by the International Union for Conservation of Nature (IUCN) as an endangered species due to habitat loss.

Taxonomy
The type specimen was collected in 1895 or 1896 and described by British zoologist Oldfield Thomas in 1908. It has been considered to be a specimen of Major's tufted-tailed rat (Eliurus majori) but new information confirmed the original identification. This species differs from E. majori by its white-tipped caudal tuft.

Habitat and distribution
Little is known about the white-tipped tufted-tailed rat because it is known from only two specimens. It has not been found during surveys in areas to the north and south of its known range.

Status
This species has not been recorded from protected areas. It is thought that it could be threatened by the fragmentation of its humid forest habitat to cultivated land, and it is possible that all species of the subfamily Nesomyinae suffer from a plague carried by introduced rodents.

References

Eliurus
Mammals described in 1908
Endemic fauna of Madagascar
Taxa named by Oldfield Thomas